The 2012–13 Tercera División was the fourth tier of football in Spain. Play started on 24 August 2012 and the season ended on 30 June 2013 with the promotion play-off finals.

Overview
There were 359 clubs competing in  Tercera División (Third division) in the 2012–13 season, divided into 18 regional groups, accommodating between 18 and 21 clubs.

The following clubs finished as champions of their respective groups

Grupo I (Galicia) - Racing de Ferrol
Grupo II (Asturias) - Tuilla
Grupo III (Cantabria) - Tropezón
Grupo IV (País Vasco) - Laudio
Grupo V (Cataluña) - Olot
Grupo VI (Comunidad Valenciana) - Elche Ilicitano
Grupo VII (Comunidad de Madrid) - Puerta Bonita
Grupo VIII (Castilla & León) - Burgos
Grupo IX (Andalucía Oriental (Almería, Granada, Jaén & Málaga) & Melilla) - El Palo
Grupo X (Andalucía Occidental (Cádiz, Córdoba, Huelva & Sevilla) & Ceuta) - Algeciras
Grupo XI (Islas Baleares) - Santa Eulàlia
Grupo XII (Canarias) - Las Palmas Atlético
Grupo XIII (Región de Murcia) - La Hoya Lorca
Grupo XIV (Extremadura) - Extremadura
Grupo XV (Navarra) - San Juan
Grupo XVI (La Rioja) - Haro
Grupo XVII (Aragón) - Sariñena
Grupo XVIII (Castilla-La Mancha) - Toledo

The 18 group champion clubs participated in the Group winners promotion play-off and the losers from these 9 play-off ties then proceeded to the Non-champions promotion play-off with clubs finishing second third and fourth.

League standings

Group I - Galicia

Top goalscorer

Top goalkeeper

Group II - Asturias

Top goalscorer

Top goalkeeper

Group III - Cantabria

Top goalscorer

Top goalkeeper

Group IV - Basque Country

Top goalscorer

Top goalkeeper

Group V - Catalonia

Top goalscorer

Top goalkeeper

Group VI - Valencian Community

Top goalscorer

Top goalkeeper

Group VII - Community of Madrid

Top goalscorer

Top goalkeeper

Group VIII - Castilla and León

Top goalscorer

Top goalkeeper

Group IX - Eastern Andalusia and Melilla

Top goalscorer

Top goalkeeper

Group X - Western Andalusia and Ceuta

Top goalscorer

Top goalkeeper

Group XI - Balearic Islands

Top goalscorer

Top goalkeeper

Group XII - Canary Islands

Top goalscorer

Top goalkeeper

Group XIII - Region of Murcia

Top goalscorer

Top goalkeeper

Group XIV - Extremadura

Top goalscorer

Top goalkeeper

Group XV - Navarra

Top goalscorer

Top goalkeeper

Group XVI - La Rioja

Top goalscorer

Top goalkeeper

Group XVII - Aragón

Top goalscorer

Top goalkeeper

Group XVIII - Castilla-La Mancha

Top goalscorer

Top goalkeeper

Promotion play-offs

Group winners promotion play-off

Non-champions promotion play-off

Notes

External links
 Real Federación Española de Fútbol
AREFE Regional
Futbolme.com
Lapreferente.com

 
Tercera División seasons
4
Spanish